In statistical hypothesis testing, a uniformly most powerful (UMP) test is a hypothesis test which has the greatest power  among all possible tests of a given size α. For example, according to the Neyman–Pearson lemma, the likelihood-ratio test is UMP for testing simple (point) hypotheses.

Setting 
Let  denote a random vector (corresponding to the measurements), taken from a parametrized family of probability density functions or probability mass functions  , which depends on the unknown deterministic parameter . Let  denote the hypothesis that , and let  denote the hypothesis that .
The binary test of hypotheses is performed using a test function  with a reject region  (a subset of measurement space).

meaning that  is in force if the measurement  and that  is in force if the measurement .
Note that  is a disjoint covering of the measurement space.

Formal definition 
A test function  is UMP of size  if for any other test function  satisfying

we have

The Karlin–Rubin theorem 
The Karlin–Rubin theorem can be regarded as an extension of the Neyman–Pearson lemma for composite hypotheses. Consider a scalar measurement having a probability density function parameterized by a scalar parameter θ, and define the likelihood ratio .

where  is chosen such that 

is the UMP test of size α for testing 

Note that exactly the same test is also UMP for testing

Important case: exponential family 
Although the Karlin-Rubin theorem may seem weak because of its restriction to scalar parameter and scalar measurement, it turns out that there exist a host of problems for which the theorem holds. In particular, the one-dimensional exponential family of probability density functions or probability mass functions with

has a monotone non-decreasing likelihood ratio in the sufficient statistic , provided that  is non-decreasing.

Example 
Let  denote i.i.d. normally distributed -dimensional random vectors with mean  and covariance matrix . We then have

which is exactly in the form of the exponential family shown in the previous section, with the sufficient statistic being

 

Thus, we conclude that the test

is the UMP test of size  for testing  vs.

Further discussion 
Finally, we note that in general, UMP tests do not exist for vector parameters or for two-sided tests (a test in which one hypothesis lies on both sides of the alternative). The reason is that in these situations, the most powerful test of a given size for one possible value of the parameter (e.g. for  where ) is different from the most powerful test of the same size for a different value of the parameter (e.g. for  where ). As a result, no test is uniformly most powerful in these situations.

References

Further reading 
 
 
 L. L. Scharf, Statistical Signal Processing, Addison-Wesley, 1991, section 4.7.

Statistical hypothesis testing